Powellisetia unicarinata is a species of marine gastropod mollusc in the family Rissoidae. First described by Powell in 1930 as Notosetia unicarinata, it is endemic to the waters of New Zealand.

Taxonomy

Originally described as Notosetia unicarinata in 1930 by Powell, the species name was revised as Powellisetia unicarinata in 1965 by Winston Ponder.

Description

Powellisetia bilirata has a minute, roughly ovate shell with a single strong spiral ridge. It is coloured dull-white. The species measures 1.19mm, by 0.59mm. The species' shell has a reasonably tall spire and a strongly tilted protoconch, and shell width is the major factor that varies between individuals in the species.

The species is similar in appearance to Powellisetia porcellanoides, but can be distinguished by its angled carnate shoulder.

Distribution

The species is endemic to New Zealand. The holotype dredged by Powell in 1924, from a depth of 9–11 metres at Tryphena Bay on Great Barrier Island.. It is found in the north-east of the North Island, as far north as Manawatāwhi / Three Kings Islands,

References

Rissoidae
Gastropods described in 1930
Gastropods of New Zealand
Endemic fauna of New Zealand
Endemic molluscs of New Zealand
Molluscs of the Pacific Ocean
Taxa named by Arthur William Baden Powell